Kurkure is a brand of spiced crunchy puffcorn snacks made up of rice, lentil and corn, owned by PepsiCo. It is the Indian version of American Flamin' Hot Cheetos. It was launched in 1999 in the country. The snack is currently being manufactured and sold in India, Pakistan and Bangladesh. The snack has limited availability in certain international markets such as Canada and the United Kingdom.

The word Kurkure means "crunchy" in Hindi, Urdu and Bengali.

In India it is manufactured in Sangrur, Pune, Howrah, Sonipat, Ranga Reddy, Vaishali and Kamrup. In Pakistan it is manufactured in Gulberg, Lahore and in Bangladesh the snack is manufactured in Bogra.

Ingredients
Kurkure is made from rice meal, edible vegetable oil (palm oil), corn meal, gram meal, spices (such as turmeric), condiments, salt, sugar, tartaric, and E631. Kurkure is not completely vegan as the PepsiCo website in a pdf listing the ingredients show milk solids as one of the ingredients. 

It contains natural, nature-identical, and artificial flavouring substances.

The ingredients are different in the UK.

Flavours

India
In India Kurkure is available in the following flavours:

 Masala Munch
 Green Chutney 
 Chilli Chatka
 Tamatar Hyderabadi Style
 Masala Twists (Solid Masti)
 Desi Beats
 Naughty Tomato
 Puffcorn (Yummy Cheese)
 Monster Paws
 Hyderabadi Hungama
 Lime pickle      
 Zig Zag
 Puff Corn
 Corn Cups
 Solid Masti
 Monster Smilies
 Tangy Tamato
 Butter Masti
 Kurkure triangles
 Khatta Meetha
 Multigrain
 Chatpata Cheese

Kurkure is also made in other limited edition flavours for various occasions like Puja or Diwali.

Pakistan
Red Chili Jhatka
Chutney Chaska
Salt & Pepper Masti
Sweet Lime Chatpat
Dahi Papri Chaat
Barbecue
Cream N’ Onion
Cheese N’ Garlic
Hot N’ Spicy
Sour Cream Maska
Halke Phulke
Cheese Karara
Toofani Masala

As in India, Kurkure is also available in other limited edition flavours for various occasions like Eid.

Bangladesh
Masala Munch
Cream and Onion
Chilli Chatka
Naughty Tomato
Spicy Chicken
'Masala Munch', 'Chilli Chatka' are as same as their Indian counterparts (India has same named flavours).

Marketing
In 1999, Kurkure was initially launched in India, Indian television actress Pooja Ghai appeared in the television commercial and served as the first brand ambassador. In 2004, Indian Hindi film actress Juhi Chawla was featured in advertisements for Kurkure. Kurkure was launched in Tamil Media in 2008 with actress Simran as its brand ambassador. In 2012, Parineeti Chopra, Kunal Kapoor, Boman Irani, Ramya Krishnan, and Farida Jalal, started to advertise Kurkure. In 2019 Samantha Ruth Prabhu acted in Tamil and Telugu commercials of Kurkure.

Following the Pakistani launch in 2007, actresses Ayesha Omer, Hania Amir and Iqra Aziz have all been featured in television commercials for Kurkure. In November 2006, Frito-Lay announced plans to release Kurkure to American markets in 2007. This decision was made after analysts showed increasing interest in Indian spices in the region. Kurkure was subsequently introduced in other markets with a significant non-resident Indian population such as the UK. As of 2013, Kurkure is available in Western Canada. As of 2010, Kurkure is available in Eastern Canada.

It was launched in Bangladesh in 2015 by Transcom Consumer Products Ltd.

Free Internet Data
From September 2020, Airtel had provided its users 1GB free internet data with a packet of Kurkure costing Rs 10.

Controversy 
In July 2018, it was reported that PepsiCo had been granted an order by the Delhi High Court, ordering Facebook, Instagram, Twitter, and YouTube to remove or block various "disparaging and defamatory" posts perpetuating a false rumour that Kurkure products contain plastics. The rumour had frequently been spread via videos depicting the snacks being flammable, though this is based primarily on their starch content. PepsiCo faced criticism over the move, as it also included the geoblocking of Twitter posts that were clearly satirizing the controversy and order.

References

External links
 (India)
Kurkure Pakistan
Transcom Bangladesh

1999 establishments in India
2007 establishments in Pakistan
2015 establishments in Bangladesh
Frito-Lay brands
Brand name snack foods
Indian snack foods
Pakistani snack foods
Bangladeshi snack foods
PepsiCo brands